Interstate 94 (I-94) generally runs north–south through the northeastern portion of the US state of Illinois, in Lake and Cook counties. It is signed east–west in Illinois in accordance with its general alignment across the country, with west signage aligned with northbound travel and vice versa.

The William G. Edens Expressway (also known as the Edens Parkway and the Edens Superhighway) is the main major expressway north from the city of Chicago to Northbrook. Only the short portion from the spur ramp to the expressway's end in Highland Park does not carry I-94. It was the first expressway in Chicago and was opened on December 20, 1951. It has three lanes in each direction. The original name of the expressway was the Edens Parkway, named after William Grant Edens (1863–1957), a banker and early advocate for paved roads. He was a sponsor of Illinois's first highway bond issue in 1918.

From the southern terminus of the Edens, I-94 follows part or all of several other named highways; joining I-90 on the Kennedy Expressway and the Dan Ryan Expressway through the center of Chicago, following the Bishop Ford Freeway through the southside of Chicago to I-80, where it joins the Kingery Expressway before entering Indiana.

Route description 
The control cities for I-94 generally are Wisconsin or Milwaukee to the north and west, Chicago or the Chicago Loop for those heading to the central portion, and Indiana to the south and east.

Wisconsin to Downtown Chicago 

I-94 traverses rural and suburban areas in Lake County and the length of the city of Chicago, running just west of the Chicago Loop on the Kennedy Expressway, and serves Six Flags Great America, the Gurnee Mills mall, extensive office developments and residential districts in southern Lake County and the North Shore region of Cook County, and Westfield Old Orchard.

Entering Illinois from Wisconsin, I-94 becomes the Tri-State Tollway just after exit 1B (Skokie Highway), with eight lanes (four in each direction), until just north of Deerfield Road where it widens further to 10 lanes as it approaches I-294 and the Edens Spur. This is where three lanes for the Tri-State Tollway branch off and begin I-294 while two lanes for I-94 head east onto the Edens Spur which only has four lanes total (two in each direction).

The highway turns south and widens back to six lanes as it merges with US Route 41 (US 41) and becomes the Edens Expressway, and then widens to 10 lanes (four lanes in each direction plus two reversible lanes) along the Kennedy Expressway. At Ohio Street, the reversible lanes terminate and the highway has 10 lanes to the Jane Byrne Interchange, where the left lane ends and the right lane exits onto the Eisenhower Expressway (I-290).

Until 2010, mileposts along the Tri-State Tollway portion of I-94 reflected the distance from the southeastern terminus of the tollway, that led to a counterintuitive increase in the mile numbers as one proceeds "west". In 2010, the milemarkers were renumbered to indicate mileage of I-94 traveled in Illinois, increasing from the Wisconsin border to the Indiana border.

Downtown Chicago to Indiana 

South of Downtown Chicago, I-94 serves the southeast suburbs of Chicago, including Dolton, Calumet City, and South Holland, until it joins I-80 on the Kingery Expressway, which finally enters Indiana east of Lansing, Illinois.

I-94 has 10 lanes (five in each direction) from the exit ramps of the Jane Byrne Interchange to the Stevenson Expressway (I-55). It then splits into a 14-lane freeway on the Dan Ryan Expressway, with three and four lanes alternating between the local and express lanes in both directions. At the Chicago Skyway, a two-lane ramp carries traffic to I-90, leaving 10 lanes (five in each direction) running south to the I-57/I-94 junction.

From I-57, where I-94 is called the Bishop Ford Freeway, to Cottage Grove Avenue, the route has four lanes (two lanes each way), with six lanes (three lanes each way) between Michigan and Cottage Grove avenues. The freeway connection ramp to Stony Island Avenue has four lanes (two in each direction). I-94 then has six lanes (three in each direction) south to I-80, where it departs the Bishop Ford Freeway (which continues south as Illinois Route 394 [IL 394]) for the Kingery Expressway. On these ramps to and from I-80, I-94 has two lanes in each direction. On the Kingery Expressway itself, the combined I-80/I-94 route widens to eight lanes (four in each direction) to the Indiana state line.

The section including the Southland Interchange with I-80 and I-294 was reconfigured as part of the Kingery Expressway reconstruction project, completed in 2007, including four lanes south of 159th Street, with the split between I-80 and I-94 east to the left, and I-80 west, I-294 north, and IL 394 south on the right located north of the 170th Street overpass. The configuration of I-80 and I-94 is discussed in connection with the Kingery Expressway.

History 

I-494 was originally planned to serve as a loop in Chicago and follow Lake Shore Drive along Lake Michigan. The first iteration of I-494 was dropped in response to local opposition. Portions of the old I-494 exist as US 41 (Lake Shore Drive) and the Ohio Street connector. In addition, I-494 was also planned at one point to be a western bypass of Chicago, as the Crosstown Expressway.

In 1998, the Illinois Tollway removed the entire Deerfield Toll Plaza north of the I-294/I-94 merge point, then considered one of the worst snags on the tollway system. It was replaced with the Huehl Road Toll Plaza on the Edens Spur to charge traffic that followed I-94 into Chicago. Tolls were removed from the northbound exit/southbound entrance to I-294 at Lake Cook Road, while tolls at the Waukegan Toll Plaza were increased, and additional toll plazas were built on exits south of Deerfield at Lake–Cook Road, Willow Road, and Golf Road (IL 58). Toll collection facilities were also added to entrance ramps to northbound I-94 at those points.

The Edens Expressway section of I-94 was last rehabilitated from 1978 through 1980. From 2007 to 2009, I-94 was widened from six to eight lanes between IL 173 (Rosecrans Road) and IL 22 (Half Day Road).

In 1996, the Calumet Expressway was renamed in honor of Bishop Louis Henry Ford, the leader of the Church of God in Christ who had died the previous year.

On April 4, 2008, the Illinois Department of Transportation (IDOT) closed one lane in each direction for the entire length of the freeway. The closures lasted until August 2008, occurred in advance of patching and resurfacing of the mainline. In addition, the $42.8-million (equivalent to $ in ) project was to rehabilitate six bridges and improve drainage at four underpasses.

The Calumet Expressway was originally an extension of Doty Avenue. There were traffic lights at the intersections of Doty Avenue with 111th, 115th, and 130th streets, but interchanges were built in the early 1960s. The expressway was originally designated as IL 1, Alternate US 30, and certain portions as US 6 and IL 83, but IL 1 returned to Halsted Street, and US 6 and IL 83 were routed onto Torrence Avenue. In 1962, the connection between the Calumet and Dan Ryan expressways opened and is now signed as part of the Bishop Ford.

In 2006–2007, the portion south of 159th Street was reconstructed as part of the Kingery Expressway–Southland Interchange project. The section between 159th Street and Martin Luther King Jr. Drive was rehabilitated and resurfaced in mid- to late 2009.

Exit list

References

External links 
 Historic, Current & Average Travel Times For The Edens Expressway

Expressways in the Chicago area
 Illinois
94
Transportation in Lake County, Illinois
Transportation in Cook County, Illinois